Ifo is a town in south-western Nigeria near Lagos.

Transport 

It is served by a junction station on the national railway network.

See also 

 Railway stations in Nigeria

References 

Towns in Nigeria